= 1954 Ålandic legislative election =

Legislative elections were held in Åland on 15 June 1954.

== Results ==
Party	Votes	%	Seats
Allmänna valförbundet	4,962	92.39	28
Folkdemokraterna	409	7.61	2
Total	5,371	100.00	30
Valid votes	5,371	99.80	
Invalid/blank votes	11	0.20	
Total votes	5,382	100.00	
Registered voters/turnout	14,734	36.53	
Source: Arjan Schakel
